Orthotylus adenocarpi purgantis is a subspecies of bug from the Miridae family that can be found in Andorra and Spain.

References

Insects described in 1957
Hemiptera of Europe
adenocarpi purgantis